2007 in professional wrestling describes the year's events in the world of professional wrestling championship.

List of notable promotions 
These promotions held notable shows in 2007.

Calendar of notable shows

January

February

March

April

May

June

July

August

September

October

November

December

Notable incidents
June 22–24 – Chris Benoit double-murder and suicide

Accomplishments and tournaments

AAA

AAA Hall of Fame

Ring of Honor

TNA

TNA Year End Awards

WWE

WWE Hall of Fame

Awards and honors

Pro Wrestling Illustrated

Wrestling Observer Newsletter

Wrestling Observer Newsletter Hall of Fame

Wrestling Observer Newsletter awards

Title changes

AAA

NJPW

ROH

TNA

WWE 
 – Raw
 – SmackDown
 - ECW

Raw and SmackDown each had a world championship, a secondary championship, and a tag team championship for male wrestlers. ECW only had a world championship. SmackDown also had a title for their cruiserweight wrestlers. There was only one women's championship and it was exclusive to Raw.

Debuts
Uncertain debut date
Brittany Force
 Pentagon Jr.
 February 17 - Lince Dorado
 March 13 - Sanada
 July 29 - Rush
 September 8 - Buddy Matthews
 December 29 – Masato Inaba

Retirements

 Robbie Rage (1995–2007)
 Rebecca DiPietro (October 17, 2006 – March 22, 2007)
 Chris Kanyon (April 5, 1992 – April 5, 2007) (First retirement, returned to wrestling in 2009) 
 King Kong Bundy (1981-May 12, 2007) 
 Trinity (2002 – June 22, 2007)
 Dusty Rhodes (1967–July 22,2007) (Returned for a match in 2010)
 Monty Brown (2000 – September 19, 2007)
 Maven Huffman  (2001 – October 5, 2007) (first retirement, returned in 2015 until retiring in 2016) 
 Mr. Wrestling II (1955 – October 13, 2007)
 Bob Backlund (1973–December 10, 2007) (First retirement, returned to wrestling in 2009 and wrestled his last match in 2018)

Deaths 

 January 4 – Cowboy Lang, 56
 January 6 – Yvon Durelle, 77
 January 9 – Cocoa Samoa, 61
 January 19 – Bam Bam Bigelow, 45
 February 17 – Mike Awesome, 42
 March 6 
 Bad News Brown, 63
 Ray "Thunder" Stern, 74
 March 8 – Black Shadow, 85
 March 10 – Ernie Ladd, 68
 March 13 – Arnold Skaaland, 82
 March 18 – Ángel Azteca, 43
 March 28 – Abe Coleman, 101
 May 7 – Sonny Myers, 83
 June 2 – Sandy Barr, 69
 June 15 – Sherri Martel, 49
 June 22 
 Nancy Benoit, 43
 Biff Wellington, 42
 June 24 – Chris Benoit, 40
 July 15 - Devil Bhudakhan, 32
 July 18 – John Kronus, 38
 July 23 – Tor Kamata, 70
 July 23 - Ronnie P. Gossett, 63
 July 28 – Karl Gotch, 82
 August 11 – Bronko Lubich, 81
 August 13 – Crush, 43
 August 16 – Dewey Robertson, 68
 August 29 - Iron Mike Steele, 52
 August 31 – Karloff Lagarde, 79
 September 7 – Billy Darnell, 81
 September 10 – Enrique Torres, 85
 October 2 - Sean Evans (wrestler), 36
 November 2 – The Fabulous Moolah, 84
 November 25 – Angel of Death, 54

See also
List of NJPW pay-per-view events
List of ROH pay-per-view events
List of TNA pay-per-view events
List of WWE pay-per-view events

References

 
professional wrestling